Édgar Alexánder Campos Mora, better known as Alex Campos, is a Colombian evangelical singer-songwriter.

Campos has won three Latin Grammy Awards for Best Christian Album in Spanish. He has recorded duets with Christian artists such as Marcos Witt, Jesus Adrian Romero, Marcela Gandara, Lilly Goodman, and Jorge Celedon, and the well known David Toledo. He has also produced for other Colombian artists including Fonseca, Sara Borráez and Su Presencia.

Biography

Early life
Campos, the eldest of four brothers, grew up in a dysfunctional family. At the age of twelve, he started attending the local Christian church. At the age of 14, he joined his first musical group, in which he played the recorder.

Career
Campos formed the group Misión Vida when he was 17 years old. the band consists of Esteban Machuca and Freud Romero 

The first was a live recording in Bogotá, Colombia, titled Tiempo de la Cruz (English: Time of the Cross). Soon after, he released a studio album, Al Taller del Maestro (To the Master's Workshop). Campos dedicated this album to God because he believed that God had healed a tumor in his throat. His third album was a live version of Al Taller del Maestro, recorded in Bogotá, Colombia. He followed this with Como un Niño (Like a Child),  (The Sound of Silence) and Cuidaré de Ti (I'll Take Care of You).

On July 18, 2007, Campos and Misión Vida went to Juncos, Puerto Rico, to take part in La Mina Music Fest. He was featured in Jesus Adrian Romero's album Ayer Te Vi... Fue Más Claro Que La Luna, singing a duet with Romero titled "Razones Pa' Vivir", and in David Toledo's album Soldados De Jesús.

Campos performed concerts to promote and raise funds for the organization Misión Child. He became the first Christian singer to sell out a concert at José Miguel Agrelot Coliseum in San Juan, Puerto Rico, with an audience of 12,000. Campos's seventh album, Te Puedo Sentir, was a live concert recording.

He recorded an album titled  which earned his first Latin Grammy win. In 2012, Campos recorded . In 2015, he released a live studio session album titled .

Personal life
On March 22, 2004, Campos married Natalia Rodríguez. Together they have a daughter and a son.

Discography

Albums

Studio albums

Live albums

Awards and nominations

GMA Dove Awards
A Dove Award is an accolade by the Gospel Music Association (GMA) of the United States to recognise outstanding achievement in the Christian music industry. Alex Campos has received one award.

|-
| 2013 || Hillsong: Global Project Español (as featured artist) || Spanish Album of the Year ||

Latin Grammy Awards
A Latin Grammy Award is an accolade by the Latin Academy of Recording Arts & Sciences to recognise outstanding achievement in the music industry. Campos has received three awards from five nominations.

|-
| 2008 || Cuidaré de Ti || Best Christian Album (Spanish Language) || 
|-
| 2010 || Te Puedo Sentir || Best Christian Album (Spanish Language) || 
|-
| 2011 || Lenguage De Amor || Best Christian Album (Spanish Language) || 
|-
| 2013 || Regreso A Ti || Best Christian Album (Spanish Language) || 
|-
| 2015 || Derroche de Amor || Best Christian Album (Spanish Language) ||

Premios Arpa
A Premio ARPA is an accolade from the Academia Nacional de la Música y las Artes Cristianas of Mexico to recognise outstanding achievement in the Latin Christian music industry. Alex Campos has received eight awards from thirty nominations.

|-
| style="text-align:center;" rowspan="4"|2004 || Himself || Composer of the Year || 
|-
| Al Taller del Maestro || Best Album for a Group or Duo || 
|-
| Al Taller del Maestro || Best Pop/Rock Album  || 
|-
| Al Taller del Maestro || Album of the Year || 
|-
| style="text-align:center;" rowspan="4"|2006 || "Sueño de Morir" || Song of the Year || 
|-
| Como un Niño || Best Masculine Vocal Album || 
|-
| Como un Niño || Best Pop/Rock Album|| 
|-
| "Sueño de Morir" || Best Music Video || 
|-
| style="text-align:center;" rowspan="4"|2007 || "El Sonido del Silencio" || Song of the Year || 
|-
| El Sonido del Silencio || Best Masculine Vocal Album || 
|-
| Himself || Producer of the Year || 
|-
| El Sonido del Silencio || Best Live Album || 
|-
| style="text-align:center;" rowspan="2"|2009 || "Como el Color de la Sangre" || Best Music Video || 
|-
| "Dímelo" || Best Collaboration || 
|-
| style="text-align:center;" rowspan="6"|2011 || Te Puedo Sentir || Best Masculine Vocal Album || 
|-
| Te Puedo Sentir || Best Pop/Rock Album || 
|-
| Te Puedo Sentir || Album of the Year || 
|-
| Te Puedo Sentir || Best Long Form Music Video || 
|-
| Te Puedo Sentir || Best Live Album || 
|-
| Te Puedo Sentir || Best Singer-Songwriter Album || 
|-
| 2012 || Lenguaje de Amor || Best Pop/Rock Album || 
|-
| style="text-align:center;" rowspan="9"|2013 || "No Tiene Prisa" || Song of the Year || 
|-
| Himself || Composer of the Year || 
|-
| Regreso a Ti || Best Masculine Vocal Album|| 
|-
| Himself || Producer of the Year || 
|-
| Regreso a Ti || Album of the Year || 
|-
| "No Tiene Prisa" || Best Music Video || 
|-
| Regreso a Ti || Best Pop/Fusion Album || 
|-
| "Me Amas" (with Lilly Goodman) || Best Collaboration || 
|-
| "Suave Voz" || Best Collaboration ||

Premios Nuestra Tierra
A Premio Nuestra Tierra is an accolade that recognises outstanding achievement in the Colombian music industry. Campos has received one award from one nomination.

|-
| style="text-align:center;" rowspan="1"|2014 || Himself || Best Christian Artist  ||

References

External links
Alexcampos.com.co – biography 

1976 births
Living people
Colombian Christians
21st-century Colombian male singers
Colombian performers of Christian music
Colombian singer-songwriters
Latin Grammy Award winners
Singers from Bogotá
Spanish-language singers